William & Catherine: A Royal Romance is a 2011 American made-for-television biographical film that stars Alice St. Clair as Catherine Middleton and Dan Amboyer as Prince William of Wales. The movie also features Jane Alexander as Queen Elizabeth II and Victor Garber as Prince Charles, Prince of Wales. The plot summary provided by Internet Movie Database is, "Chronicles Prince William and Kate Middleton, as young students at St. Andrews, William's Army training at Sandhurst Military Academy, their break-up, reunification, engagement and planning of royal nuptials, and advice from William's grandmother, the Queen."

"We are not afraid to explore the real side of the relationship and the challenges," Dan Amboyer, who plays William, said while promoting the movie at a meeting of the Television Critics Association.
"Diana features in the film," Alice St. Clair, who portrays Middleton, said. "There is just really a great sense of relationships within the family. So there is William's relationship with his father and his brother, and you see him calling upon Diana's interview, and watching this interview that Diana did and using her words to kind of guide him through his troubled moments.".

Garber, who plays the Prince of Wales, said the recent unavoidable worldwide television wedding event has likely boosted the public mood regarding Britain's monarchy.
"I think it has done an enormous service to the royal family, and I think that this film really sort of attempts to kind of humanize them," he said. "I think because enough time has passed since the tragedy of Diana’s death, that they’re sort of being seen in a different way. And I think that William and Kate have definitely had an enormously positive effect on their reputation, on their how they are perceived."
Even Garber's character has likely enjoyed a boost in popularity, unthinkable once.
"I think that he was vilified in a way," he said. "Over time that has sort of softened, and yes, I think I certainly my opinion of him has changed somewhat having played him and listened to him. I think he’s kind of an amazing guy, actually."

The movie is directed by and produced by Emmy Award-winning producer Linda Yellen (Playing for Time). The co-producer is Emmy Award nominee Brad Krevoy (Taking Chance).

The movie aired on August 27, 2011, in the United States on the Hallmark Channel.  The movie was filmed on location in Bucharest.

Cast
 Alice St Clair  –  Catherine Middleton
 Dan Amboyer  –  Prince William
 Victor Garber  –  Charles, Prince of Wales
 Kazia Pelka  –  Carole Middleton
 Jean Smart  –  Camilla, Duchess of Cornwall
 Jane Alexander - The Queen
 Andrew Pleavin - Col Huntington
 Jenna Harrison - Jenna Kirk
 Michael Lumsden - Michael Middleton
 Lesley Harcourt - Diana, Princess of Wales
 Stanley Eldridge - Prince Harry
 Mark Penfold - The Duke of Edinburgh

References

External links
 

2011 television films
2011 films
2010s biographical films
Films about weddings in the United Kingdom
Cultural depictions of Catherine, Princess of Wales
Cultural depictions of William, Prince of Wales
Hallmark Channel original films
American biographical films
Films directed by Linda Yellen
Films shot in Romania
2010s American films